The fossa of vestibule of vagina (or fossa navicularis) is a boat-shaped depression between the vagina/hymen and the frenulum labiorum pudendi. The small openings of the Bartholin's ducts can be seen in the grooves between the hymen and the labia minora, on either side.

Additional Images

See also
 Vulval vestibule

References 

Mammal female reproductive system